Fabius Mieses (31 October 1824 – 10 October 1898) was a Galician writer, poet, and philosopher of the Haskalah. Besides numerous published books, he frequently contributed poetry and articles to various Hebrew and German periodicals.

Biography
Mieses was born in 1824 into a prominent Jewish family in Brody, the son of Sarah Geleh and Solomon Joshua ha-Kohen Mieses. His younger brother was chess master Samuel Mieses. At an early age he showed signs of great intellect, and was hailed as an illui. He received a thorough education; until the age of 15, he studied Hebrew literature exclusively. Among his teachers was David Lokaczer, a disciple of Nachman Krochmal. He later attended his grandfather Zalman Redler's beth midrash.

He lived in the house of his great-uncle (and later father-in-law) , a scholar living in Krakow, from 1840 to 1846. There he met, besides Solomon Judah Loeb Rapoport and other maskilim, his future teacher, M. Schöngut, who initiated him into the study of philosophy, and with whom he used to converse in Hebrew during their regular daily walks. At the same time, he assiduously applied himself to the study of German, French, Italian, Latin, mathematics, and astronomy. 

Mieses wrote the first translation into Hebrew of the "To be, or not to be" soliloquy from Hamlet in 1842, based on a German translation by Moses Mendelssohn, but it remained unpublished until 1891. He published his first article, a critical review of his father-in-law's Wirren im Judenthum, in Zecharias Frankel's magazine Zeitschrift für die Religiösen Interessen des Judenthums in 1845.

In 1849 Mieses made his first trip abroad, to Leipzig, where he befriended Julius Fürst. He soon became assistant editor of and a regular contributor to Fürst's paper Der Orient. He moved to Breslau in 1854, where he met Heinrich Grätz, Abraham Geiger, Zecharias Frankel and Manuel Joël, and permanently settled in Leipzig in 1867. Mieses carried on a lively correspondence with B. L. Landau, and from 1877 was a close friend of Leopold von Sacher-Masoch, in whose literary magazine Auf der Höhe he published a polemical treatise on Jewish history.

He died at Leipzig on 10 October 1898.

Work
In 1846, Mieses' German essay "Gegenwart und Vergangeuheit im Judenthume" appeared serially in Fürst's periodical Der Orient. Later, between 1868 and 1871, he devoted a series of articles to the question of religious reform in the journals Ha-Maggid and Ha-Melitz, which were later published as the collection Hegyoni ha-tzofe. One article, Milḥemet ha-dat, presented a exposition of the thought processes leading to the German-Jewish Reform movement. 

In 1878, Mieses published a didactic poem entitled Ha-emunah veha-tevunah (previously printed in Ha-Maggid), treating of Darwinism and its opponents. By this production, he gained for himself a prominent and lasting place among Hebrew poets. His most celebrated work was Korot ha-filosofyah ha-ḥadashah (first volume, Leipzig, 1887), a history of modern philosophy from Kant to Hegel. Since this work was the first treatise in Hebrew on modern philosophy, the author often had to create new terms and names for philosophical concepts. A second and third volume of the work remained in manuscript.

Other works by Mieses include Ha-kabbala veha-ḥasidut (Breslau, 1866; Odessa, 1871); Shirim (Krakow, 1891), a collection of miscellaneous poems; and Die Bibel der Vernunft (Leipzig, 1895).

Selected bibliography
 
 
 
  9 (1). 1869.
 
  
 
  Published in Hebrew in Ha-Mitzpe, 1886.

References
 

1824 births
1898 deaths
19th-century Austrian philosophers
19th-century Austrian poets
19th-century Jews
19th-century Ukrainian poets
Austrian Empire expatriates in Germany
Austrian Empire Jews
English–Hebrew translators
Hebrew-language poets
Hebrew-language writers
Historians of philosophy
Jewish philosophers
Jewish poets
Jewish translators
Jews from Galicia (Eastern Europe)
People from Brody
People of the Haskalah
People from the Kingdom of Galicia and Lodomeria
Philosophers of Judaism
Translators of William Shakespeare
Ukrainian philosophers
Ukrainian writers
Writers from Leipzig